Nosferatu are an English second wave gothic rock band. As of 2022, the members are Damien DeVille (lead guitar) and Tim Vic (vocals and guitar).

History

Nosferatu were formed in March 1988 by guitarist Damien DeVille, bassist Vlad Janicek, and vocalist Sapphire Aurora. In 1990, they debuted with the track "Bloodlust" on a compilation album. Ex Grenadier Guard Gary Clarke (The Cureheads) Took over from Sapphire & fronted the band on their first Uk tour, opening for Every New Dead Ghost. Clarke left in late 1990 to start The Cureheads.  In 1991, they recorded The Hellhound EP with vocalist Louis DeWray replacing Clarke. In 1992, Dave Roberts of the gothic rock group Sex Gang Children wanted Nosferatu to release a compilation of their singles so far under the Cleopatra Records label, but the band agreed to record new songs towards their debut album Rise in 1993. Afterwards, Niall Murphy replaced DeWray on vocals for their Halloween shows.

In 1994, Nosferatu released a compilation of early recordings called Legend and their second studio album The Prophecy. Afterwards, Murphy was replaced by Dominic LaVey, and Janicek left the band, with Dante Savarelle replacing. The group signed with Hades Records, and released Prince of Darkness in 1996. In 1998, the group released Lord of the Flies with bassist Doc Milton replacing Savarelle, and featured guest drummer Rat Scabies formerly of The Damned.

Bassist Stefan Diablo replaced Milton and the band worked on the album Re Vamped, released in 1999. Re Vamped had remixes and some new tracks. In 2000, they released the live album Reflections Through a Darker Glass. They released another compilation album The Best of Nosferatu, Vol. 1 Louis DeWray officially rejoined the band in 2005, and in 2011, they released the album Wonderland under Dark Fortune Records.

In 2015, vocalist Louis DeWray left the band and Tim Vic replaced him.

Discography

Studio albums
 Rise (1993) 
 The Prophecy (1994) 
 Prince of Darkness (1996) 
 Lord of the Flies (1998)
 Wonderland (2011)

Compilation albums 
 Legend (1994) 
 Re Vamped (1999) 
 The Best of Nosferatu: Volume 1: The Hades Years

Live albums 
 Reflections Through A Darker Glass (2000)

Singles 
Some of these singles were also released as EPs, 12", CD and cassette
 "The Hellhound" (1991)
 "Vampyres Cry" (1992) 
 "Diva" (1992) 
 "Inside The Devil" (1993) 
 "Savage Kiss" (1993)

Members 
Current members
 Damien DeVille (1988–present) – guitar
 Belle Star (2007–present) – drums
 Tim Vic (2015–present) – vocals
 Thom (2016–present) – bass guitar

Former members
 Sapphire Aurora (1988–1990) – vocals
 Vlad Janicek (1988–1994) – bass guitar, keyboard
 Gary Clarke (Jan 1990-Dec 1990)
 Louis DeWray (1991–1993, 2005–2015) – vocals
 Niall Murphy (1993–1994) – vocals
 Dante Savarelle (1994–1998) – bass guitar
 Dominic LaVey (1995–2002) – vocals
 Chrys Columbine (2006-2010) - piano and keyboards
 Doc Milton (1998–2011) – bass guitar
 Stefan Diablo (2011–2016) – bass guitar

The Nosferatu 
In 2019, Vlad Janicek and Louis DeWray formed The Nosferatu. In an interview with Absolution, Janicek said it was after The Prophecy tour when DeVille "left the band" and "What followed was 1-2 years of legal stupidity during which Damien decided to form a completely new band and call it Nosferatu. After taking very expensive legal counseling l was told that l could not stop him as technically we both owned the name 50/50 and could both use it." They brought in Chris Clark who had also played briefly with Nosferatu.

The Nosferatu played their first show at The Underworld in Camden, London in November 2019 and their first overseas show in February 2020 at Temple Rock Club in Athens, Greece. The band is currently writing and recording songs for their debut album.

References

External links
 
 

English gothic rock groups
Musical groups established in 1987